Flight 470 may refer to:
National Airlines Flight 470, crashed on February 14, 1953
Western Airlines Flight 470, air accident on 31 March 1975
LAM Mozambique Airlines Flight 470, crashed on 29 November 2013

0470